A relativistic particle is a particle which moves with a relativistic speed; that is, a speed comparable to the speed of light. This is achieved by photons to the extent that effects described by special relativity are able to describe those of such particles themselves. Several approaches exist as a means of describing the motion of single and multiple relativistic particles, with a prominent example being postulations through Dirac equations of single particle motion.

Massive particles are relativistic when their kinetic energy is comparable to or greater than the energy  corresponding to their rest mass. In other words, a massive particle is relativistic when its total mass-energy (rest mass + kinetic energy) is at least twice its rest mass. This condition implies that the particle's speed is close to the speed of light. According to the Lorentz factor formula, this requires the particle to move at roughly 85% of the speed of light. Such relativistic particles are generated in particle accelerators, as well as naturally occurring in cosmic radiation. In astrophysics, jets of relativistic plasma are produced by the centers of active galaxies and quasars.

A charged relativistic particle crossing the interface of two media with different dielectric constants emits transition radiation. This is exploited in the transition radiation detectors of high-velocity particles.

See also

 Ultrarelativistic particle
 Special relativity
 Relativistic wave equations
 Lorentz factor
 Relativistic mass
 Relativistic plasma
 Relativistic jet
 Relativistic beaming
 List of plasma (physics) articles

Notes

Quantum mechanics
Special relativity
Accelerator physics